Nelonen or IV divisioona is the fifth level in the Finnish football league system and comprises 159 teams. The IV divisioona was introduced in 1973 and in the mid-1990s became known as the Nelonen (Number Four in English and Fyran in Swedish).

Competition 
There are 159 clubs in the Nelonen, divided in 14 groups of 9 to 12 teams each representing a geographical area. During the course of a season (starting in April and ending in October) each club normally plays the others twice, once at their home ground and once at that of their opponents. The top team in each Nelonen group is normally promoted to Kolmonen and the two lowest placed teams are normally relegated to the Vitonen.

Administration

Football Association of Finland (SPL)
There were 18 sections which were divided on a regional basis with between 10 and 12 teams in each.

District Football Associations
Since 1987 the administration of the Nelonen has been delegated to the 12 district authorities of the SPL.  Responsibilities for the 14 sections are divided as follows:

 SPL Helsinki - 2 sections 
 SPL Uusimaa - 2 sections
 SPL Kaakkois-Suomi - 1 section
 SPL Itä-Suomi - 1 section
 SPL Keski-Suomi - 1 section
 SPL Pohjois-Suomi - 2 sections
 SPL Keski-Pohjanmaa  - 1 section 
 SPL Vaasa  - 1 section
 SPL Satakunta  - 1 section
 SPL Tampere - 1 section
 SPL Turku and Åland FF - 1 section

Teams within the Nelonen are eligible to compete in the Suomen Cup and the Suomen Regions' Cup. The clubs are normally listed in an abbreviated form and their full names can be viewed by referring to the List of clubs or the relevant District Association.

Current clubs - 2012 Season

Seasons - League Tables

References and sources
Finnish FA
ResultCode
Nelonen (jalkapallo) - Finnish Wikipedia

Footnotes 

5
 
Fin
Professional sports leagues in Finland